Sphaerocoris annulus, common names Picasso bug or Zulu hud bug (Zulu: "iCikwa"), is a species of shield-backed bugs of the family Scutelleridae.

Description
The basic color is green, with eleven ring-shaped spots on the scutellum. The colors and the design of these bugs represent a warning to predators. They also emit a noxious odour when disturbed. Main host plants are Gossypium species (Malvaceae), Coffea arabica (Rubiaceae), Citrus species (Rutaceae) and Vernonia amygdalina (Asteraceae). This species reproduces at the beginning of the dry season (November–December). The full development lasts 56 days.

Distribution
This species is present in tropical and subtropical Africa (Benin, Cameroon, Côte d'Ivoire, Ethiopia, Ghana,
Kenya, Malawi, Mozambique, Namibia, Nigeria, Sierra Leone, South Africa, Tanzania, Togo, Zambia and Zimbabwe).

References

External links

Scutelleridae
Hemiptera of Africa
Insects described in 1775
Taxa named by Johan Christian Fabricius